Todd Asalon is a former American baseball coach and catcher. He played college baseball at Northern Kentucky for coach Bill Aker from 1980 to 1983. He served as the head coach of the Thomas More Saints (1995–2000) and the Northern Kentucky Norse (2001–2021).

Coaching career
Asalon became a college coach in 1991 as an assistant for the Northern Kentucky Norse baseball program.

In 1995, Asalon became the head coach of Thomas More College.

After becoming the head coach of the Norse in 2001, Asalon won his first Great Lakes Valley Conference (GLVC) Coach of the Year Award in 2002. Asalon repeated as GLVC Coach of the Year in 2006. Asalon achieved his third GLVC Coach of the Year in 2009. Asalon was awarded his 4th GLVC Coach of the Year in 2010.

In 2013, the Norse moved to NCAA Division I as members of the Atlantic Sun Conference.

Just before the start of the 2021 season, Asalong announced that he would be retiring from coaching at the conclusion of the season.

Head coaching record

References

External links
Northern Kentucky Norse bio

Living people
Baseball catchers
Northern Kentucky Norse baseball players
Northern Kentucky Norse baseball coaches
Thomas More Saints baseball coaches
Year of birth missing (living people)